Eastman Pond (also known as Eastman Lake) is a  water body located in Sullivan and Grafton counties in western New Hampshire, United States, in the towns of Grantham and Enfield. Water from Eastman Pond flows via Eastman Brook and Stocker Brook to the North Branch of the Sugar River, then the Sugar River, and finally the Connecticut River.

It is the central geographical feature to the Eastman Community, which is a  community consisting of single family homes and condominiums. It serves as a major source of recreational activities for the community and the area at large.

See also

List of lakes in New Hampshire

References

Lakes of Grafton County, New Hampshire
Lakes of Sullivan County, New Hampshire